Defense of Van, Siege of Van, and variants may refer to:

Siege of Van (1548), a siege in the Ottoman–Safavid War
Defense of Van (1896), an act of self-defense by the Armenian population of Van against the armed forces of the Ottoman Empire
Defense of Van (1915), an act of self-defense against the Ottoman Empire's attempts to massacre the Armenian population in the vilâyet of Van